La Pobla de Mafumet is a small town in the comarca of the Tarragonès, in the province of Tarragona, Catalonia Autonomous Community, Spain.

References

External links 
Web page of the l'Ajuntament
 Government data pages 

Municipalities in Tarragonès
Populated places in Tarragonès